Some Even Fall in Love is a Canadian documentary film, directed by Guy Simoneau and released in 1980. The film profiles a number of sex workers in Montreal, including both women and men, and both cisgender and transgender workers.

The film won the Genie Award for Best Feature Length Documentary at the 2nd Genie Awards.

References

External links
 

1980 films
1980 documentary films
Canadian documentary films
Best Documentary Film Genie and Canadian Screen Award winners
Canadian LGBT-related films
Documentary films about LGBT topics
1980 LGBT-related films
Documentary films about prostitution in Canada
Women in Quebec
French-language Canadian films
1980s Canadian films